Pierre Gaxotte (19 November 1895 – 21 November 1982) was a French historian.

Gaxotte was born in Revigny-sur-Ornain, Meuse. He began his career as a history teacher at the Lycée Charlemagne and later worked as a columnist for Le Figaro. Over the course of his life he authored numerous historical studies, and was elected to the Académie française in 1953.

He is famous for his critical vision of the French Revolution, notably in The French Revolution (1928), and for his rehabilitation of the French 18th century (Louis XV's Century, 1933). He is also known as a far-right-wing journalist of the Entre-deux-Guerres period, with links to the Action française and the newspaper Je suis partout.

Works in English translation
 The French Revolution, C. Scribner's Sons, 1932.
 Louis XV and His Times, J. B. Lippincott Co., 1934.
 Frederick the Great, G. Bell and Sons, 1941 [Rep. by Yale University Press, 1942; Greenwood Press, 1975].
 The Age of Louis XIV, Macmillan, 1970.

References

1895 births
1982 deaths
People from Meuse (department)
French monarchists
People affiliated with Action Française
Members of the Académie Française
École Normale Supérieure alumni
Historians of the French Revolution
French anti-communists
French male non-fiction writers
20th-century French historians
20th-century French male writers
Le Figaro people